MonsterQuest (sometimes written as Monsterquest or Monster Quest) is an American television series that originally aired from October 31, 2007 to March 24, 2010 on the History channel. Produced by Whitewolf Entertainment, the program deals with the search for various monsters of interest to the cryptozoology subculture and paranormal entities reportedly witnessed around the world. A spin-off show, MysteryQuest, which focuses on unsolved mysteries, premiered on September 16, 2009.

The purpose of the show is best described by the narrator, Stan Bernard, in the introduction:

History channel revived the MonsterQuest series for special episodes beginning on August 28, 2020.

Reception 
Rich Rosell of Digitally Obsessed gave the show a "B−", stating, "The good news is that this isn't a trashy reality show, eager to make everything overblown and sinister. Instead, it takes a seemingly well-researched approach, leaving viewers the opportunity to make up their own minds." He also believed that the "content is certainly nerd-worthy in an I-want-to-believe/Mulder kind of way".

Cinematic Happenings Under Development (CHUD) gave the show a 5.9/10 review, saying that the show is "basically a rehashing of the 1970s/1980s TV show, In Search Of..." and "it leaves you with a sense of either 'been there, done that' or just a feeling of incompleteness because it basically raises as many questions as it tries to answer."

Diablo Cody gave the show high praise in the October 24, 2008 issue of the magazine Entertainment Weekly. She says, "I found a minotaur in that labyrinth of suck: MonsterQuest...on the History Channel."

Academics have noted that media often uncritically disseminates information from the pseudoscience and subculture of cryptozoology, including newspapers that repeat false claims made by cryptozoologists or television shows that feature cryptozoologists as monster hunters (such as Monsterquest). Media coverage of purported "cryptids" often fails to provide more likely explanations, further propagating claims made by cryptozoologists.

Cancellation 
In a statement made March 24, 2010 on the cryptozoological blog CryptoMundo, MonsterQuest producer Doug Hajicek announced that History Channel had canceled the series midway through 4th season. Hajicek said, "The official end of MonsterQuest did not happen because of any lack of topics or for lack of viewers. The Network has decided to go another direction to assure their future as a powerful force in television."

Episodes

Season one (2007–2008)

Season two (2008)

Season three (2009)

Season four (2010)

DVD Releases

Season 1

Released 2008 contains 14 episodes running approx 600 minutes

Note: Due to a production error, "Giganto - The Real King Kong" was not included on the DVD release. It has been listed that an episode titled "Tree Man" appeared on the DVD release as episode 14. But no evidence can be found to support this on any of the worldwide DVD releases.

Season 2

Released 2009 contains 20 episodes running approx 900 minutes

Season 3

Released 2009 contains 25 episodes running approx 1100 minutes

Movie Monsters
Released 2009 contains 4 episodes running approx 188 minutes

See also 
 Cryptid

References

External links 
 
 
 

History (American TV channel) original programming
Cryptozoological television series
2007 American television series debuts
2010 American television series endings